Kyprios is the stage name of David Coles, a Canadian hip hop musician.

Career
Formerly associated with the musical collective Sweatshop Union, he now records and performs exclusively as a solo artist. He appeared on all of Sweatshop Union's albums up to and including 2008's Water Street, as well as releasing three solo albums, Say Something in 2004,  12:12 in 2009 and The Midnight Sun in 2014.

Say Something was nominated for the Juno Award for Rap Recording of the Year at the 2005 Juno Awards, and his song "Ignorance Is Beautiful" was nominated for the Genie Award for Best Achievement in Music – Original Song at the 2005 Genie Awards.

In 2010, he was named the winner of CKPK-FM's Peak Performance Project, a contest for emerging musicians in Vancouver, winning over second-place finishers Said the Whale. His prize in the contest was $100,500.

After announcing his departure from Sweatshop Union in early 2011, he released two singles: "City Woman", which blends original lyrics with a re-recorded version of The Stampeders' hit "Sweet City Woman", and "How the West Was Won", a tribute to the Vancouver Canucks which he co-wrote with Rob the Viking of Swollen Members. The Lap Dog EP was released in 2012.

On April 7, 2012, Kyprios was guest editor of the Vancouver Sun and contributed a livestream video.

His most recent solo album, Midnight Sun, was released in 2014.

Discography
 Say Something (2004)
 12:12 (2009)
 The Lap Dog (2012)
 The Midnight Sun (2014)

References

21st-century Canadian rappers
Canadian male rappers
Musicians from British Columbia
People from North Vancouver
Living people
Year of birth missing (living people)
21st-century Canadian male musicians